Thakkolam is a panchayat town in Ranipet district, Tamil Nadu, India.  In Thakkolam  there is a famous Siva temple, named Jalanatheeswarar Temple, the main lord is Jalanaatheeshwaran. It is one among 276 'Paadal Petra Sthalam''. The temple is the scene for the Battle of Takkolam.

Demographics
 India census, Thakkolam had a population of 11,919. Males constitute 54% of the population and females 46%.  Thakkolam has an average literacy rate of 70%, higher than the national average of 59.5%: male literacy is 80%, and female literacy is 58%.  In Thakkolam, 10% of the population is under 6 years of age.

Transportation
With the development of a vast road network, Thakkolam is well connected to its nearby towns and villages. The Thakkolam railway station connects the village to Arakonam, Tirumalpur, Kanchipuram and Chengalpet and the Thiruvalangadu railway station connects to Chennai and Arakonam.The place has got a very famous god called Lord Dhakshinamoorthy in "Thava kolam" since ever called thakolam. Lord Dhakahinamoorthy is worshipped in Jalanadheeshwarar temple. Chennai second airport planned in parandur is nearby Thakkolam, Kanakamma chathiram - Thakkolam road connect to Chennai Thirupati national highway 205.

Thakkolam also has good connectivity with Mappedu multi purpose logistics park

References

Cities and towns in Vellore district